Emotional Animal is the third studio solo album by King's X frontman Doug Pinnick. It was released in 2005 on Magna Carta Records.

Track listing

Personnel
Doug Pinnick – vocals and all instruments, except drums
Joey Gaskill – drums

References

External links
Emotional Animal entry on Doug Pinnick's website

2005 albums
Doug Pinnick albums
Magna Carta Records albums